The Communauté métropolitaine de Québec (CMQ), or Quebec Metropolitan Community, is an administrative division of the province of Quebec, comprising the metropolitan area of Quebec City and Lévis. The CMQ is one of the two metropolitan communities of Quebec.

Predecessor

Effective January 1, 1970, the Québec Urban Community ("CUQ") was established, which governed the area surrounding Quebec City on the north shore of the St. Lawrence River. Together with the CUQ, the Québec Urban Community Transit Commission ("CTCUQ") and the Greater Québec Water Purification Board ("BAEQM") were also established. Each of the three covered different groups of municipalities:

Formation

The CUQ was replaced by the CMQ on January 1, 2002. The CMQ exercised jurisdiction over a wider geographical area.

Quebec was amalgamated with the  cities of Beauport, Cap-Rouge, Charlesbourg, L'Ancienne-Lorette, Lac-Saint-Charles, Loretteville, Saint-Émile, Sainte-Foy, Sillery, Val-Bélair, Vanier and Saint-Augustin-de-Desmaures. In the 2006 demerger, L'Ancienne-Lorette and Saint-Augustin-de-Desmaures regained separate status.

Lévis was amalgamated with Charny, Saint-Jean-Chrysostome, Saint-Nicolas, Saint-Rédempteur, Saint-Romuald, Pintendre, Saint-Étienne-de-Lauzon, Sainte-Hélène-de-Breakeyville and Saint-Joseph-de-la-Pointe-de-Lévy.

Gallery

References

External links
  Communauté métropolitaine de Québec website
 Quebec City Guide - Télégraphe de Québec

Quebec City Area
Metropolitan areas of Quebec